"I'll Walk Beside You" is a 1939 sentimental love song written by Alan Murray and Edward Lockton. It is associated with John McCormack who sang it on a number of occasions. Among the earliest recordings was one by the tenor Walter Glynne. It was also recorded by many other singers, including Vera Lynn, Peter Dawson, Richard Tauber, Webster Booth and John McHugh.

The song was popular in Britain during the Second World War. A 1943 film I'll Walk Beside You was named after it, and featured the tune throughout.

References

Bibliography
 Cartwright, Jim. John McCormack: A Comprehensive Discography. Greenwood Press, 1986.  

1939 songs
British songs
Songs with lyrics by Edward Teschemacher
Songs of World War II